Gisbert-Tristan Zarambaud (born 8 July 1997) is a Central African professional footballer who plays as a left-back for the Central African Republic national team.

Club career
A youth product of Orléans, Zarambaud began his senior career with Roche Novillars in the Championnat National 3. On 13 August 2020, he joined Jura Sud in the Championnat National 2. He left the club in 2022.

International career
Following a call-up, Zarambaud made his debut with the Central African Republic national team in a 1–1 2022 FIFA World Cup qualification tie with Cape Verde on 1 September 2021.

Personal life 
Coming from a family of sportsmen who have represented Central African football and basketball, Zarambaud is the grandson of Central African politician Théophile Sonny Cole, 1974 FIBA Africa Championship champion Sonny Pokomandji, and of famous International Criminal Court lawyer Assingambi Zarambaud.

References

External links
 
 

1997 births
Living people
People from Bangui
Central African Republic footballers
Central African Republic international footballers
Association football fullbacks
US Orléans players
Jura Sud Foot players
Championnat National 2 players
Championnat National 3 players
Central African Republic expatriate footballers
Central African Republic expatriate sportspeople in France
Expatriate footballers in France